John Henry and the Inky-Poo is a 1946 stop-motion animation film written and directed by George Pal using Pal's Puppetoons stop-motion style. The film is based on African American folk hero John Henry.

John Henry and the Inky-Poo was nominated for an Oscar for Best Animated Short for the 19th Academy Awards. In 2015, the film was selected for preservation in the United States National Film Registry by the Library of Congress as being "culturally, historically, or aesthetically significant".

It was also included in the 1987 compilation film The Puppetoon Movie.

Reception
 The Film Daily (Aug 14, 1946): "In a departure from the fables dreamed up for the familiar scarecrow and the little pickaninny (Jasper) character, usually featured in this series. George Pal has produced an engaging Puppetoon version of the legendary figure, John Henry, drawn from the annals of American Folklore, who pitted his brawn and brains against the steam engine known as the Inky Poo to dispel the fear of his railroad coworkers that machines would eventually put them out of work. The Technicolor, Rex Ingram's narration, and the folk song delivered by the Luvenia Nash singers are all standouts".
 Boxoffice (Dec 9, 1946): "Excellent musical background is furnished by the Luvenia Nash Choral group in this take off on American folk story".

References

External links 
 
 
 

1946 films
1946 animated films
1940s American animated films
1940s animated short films
American folklore films and television series
Short films directed by George Pal
Animated films about trains
American animated short films
African-American animated films
Paramount Pictures short films
Stop-motion animated short films
United States National Film Registry films
Puppetoons
1940s English-language films